Kasethan Kadavulada is a 2011 Indian Tamil-language comedy film written and directed by Thirumalai, starring Sharan, Kamna Jethmalani, Karunas, Pandiarajan, Divya Padmini, Sathyan, Manobala, Delhi Ganesh, Paravai Muniyamma, and Singamuthu playing the main characters. The film, directed by Thirumalai, has music scored by comedian and singer Karunas. It is a remake of Telugu film Blade Babji. The film received mixed reviews.

Cast

 Charan as Blade Bala
 Kamna Jethmalani as Archana
 Karunas as Karuna
 Pandiarajan as Duraisingam
 Sathyan
 Lollu Sabha Jeeva as Gaja
 Divya Padmini as Mamtha
 Delhi Ganesh
 Sankarguru Raja
 Manobala as Balram Naidu
 Mayilsamy as Thangaraj
 Singamuthu as Mani
 Singampuli as Bujjibabu
 Pandu
 Nalini as Kamala
 Paravai Muniyamma
 Babylona as Savithri
 Meera Krishnan
 Fathima Babu
 Sujibala

Soundtrack 
Soundtrack was composed by Karunas.
Panatha Kaatunga - Ananthu
Nainavukku - Grace Karunas
Unnai Orumurai - Prasanna, Kalyani
Discovukku - Anthony, Grace Karunas
Kasethan - Karunas

Release 
The New Indian Express wrote that "The director has maintained an even paced narration. But it's juvenile comedy at most times, and targeted at the lowest denominator in the audience". A critic from Kungumam praised Charan and the director's efforts. On the contrary, a critic from Dinamalar criticized the film as a whole.

References

2011 comedy films
2011 films
Tamil remakes of Telugu films
2010s Tamil-language films